Zulkarnain Hanafi is the former Minister of Health in Brunei from 2015 until 2017 and a Vice-Chancellor at the Universiti Brunei Darussalam (UBD) from 2008 to 2015.

Early life and education 
Zulkarnain went for his higher education in the United Kingdom. He obtained his MBChB from the University of Liverpool and later the FRCSEd (Otolaryngology) from the Royal College of Surgeons of Edinburgh. Lastly, FRCGP (Hon) from the Royal College of General Practitioners.

Medical career 
Hanafi is a Head and Neck Surgeon and otolaryngologist, who in 2001 was involved in the first Cochlear Implant Surgery on a child in Borneo at, Raja Isteri Pengiran Anak Saleha (RIPAS) Hospital.

On 22 October 2015, Hanafi was sworn in as the Minister of Health. For the 2017–18 fiscal year, Zulkarnain's Ministry has been given a budget allocation of B$323.88 million, including B$7,766,900 for development expenses. Hanafi praised the encouraging growth of economic prospects and avenues in the health sector, saying they should be investigated to advance more healthy concepts and advance Brunei's health agenda on 19 November 2017. His tenure concluded after two years, when Hassanal Bolkiah declared his approval for the nomination of Isham Jaafar on 1 December 2017.

Honours 
Zulkarnain Hanafi has earned the following honours;
  Order of Seri Paduka Mahkota Brunei Second Class (DPMB) – Dato Paduka (16 July 2011)
  Order of Setia Negara Brunei First Class (PSNB) – Dato Seri Setia (15 July 2016)
  Service to State Medal (PIKB)

See also 

 Cabinet of Brunei
 Health in Brunei

References 

Living people
Health ministers of Brunei
Alumni of the University of Liverpool
Year of birth missing (living people)
21st-century surgeons